David John Franco (born June 12, 1985) is an American actor and filmmaker. He began his career with small roles in films such as Superbad (2007) and Charlie St. Cloud (2010). Following a starring role in the ninth season of the comedy series Scrubs, Franco had his film breakthrough as a supporting role in the buddy comedy film 21 Jump Street (2012).

Franco has also starred in Fright Night (2011), Now You See Me (2013) and its sequel Now You See Me 2 (2016), Neighbors (2014), Nerve (2016), The Disaster Artist (2017), and Day Shift (2022). In 2020, he made his directorial debut with The Rental, which starred his wife Alison Brie.

Early life
Franco was born in Palo Alto, California, to Betsy Lou (née Verne), a poet, children's book author, and editor, and Douglas Eugene Franco (1948–2011), who ran a nonprofit agency and a business; the two met as students at Stanford University. Franco's father was of Portuguese (from Madeira) and Swedish descent. Franco's mother is Jewish (of Russian Jewish descent); her parents had changed the surname from "Verovitz" to "Verne". Franco has stated that he is "proud" to be Jewish. Franco's paternal grandmother, Marjorie (Peterson) Franco, is a published author of young adult books. Franco's maternal grandmother, Mitzie (Levine) Verne, owned the Verne Art Gallery, a prominent art gallery in Cleveland, and was an active member in the National Council of Jewish Women. Franco grew up in California with his two older brothers, James and Tom.

He studied at the University of Southern California, and originally envisioned himself as a high school teacher teaching creative writing, until his brother James Franco's manager guided him to a theater class when he was a sophomore, where he started learning acting skills.

Career

2000s
In 2006, Franco made his acting debut on The CW drama television series 7th Heaven. He appeared in television shows such as Do Not Disturb and Young Justice. Franco also had noticeable roles in films such as Superbad and The Shortcut. In May 2008, he was cast in The CW teen drama television series Privileged. The series centered on a live-in tutor for two spoiled heiresses in Palm Beach. Franco was cast in an initial major recurring role. The series premiered on September 9, 2008, to 3.1 million viewers. Ratings continued to slip each week, with the series sixth episode reaching 1.837 million viewers. The CW did not renew the series for a second season due to low ratings.

In August 2009, Variety announced Franco was cast in a regular role for the ninth season of the ABC sitcom series Scrubs. Franco portrayed the role of medical student Cole Aaronson, whose family paid a large sum of money to Sacred Heart Hospital so that he would receive an internship. Franco went on to appear in all thirteen episodes of the ninth season and received praise from critics for his performance; however, the ninth was the final season of the series.

2010s
MTV Networks' NextMovie.com named him one of its "Breakout Stars to Watch For" in 2011. In August 2011, Franco starred in the 3D horror comedy film Fright Night alongside Colin Farrell and Toni Collette. The film is a remake of the 1985 film of the same name and follows a teenage boy who finds out his neighbor is a vampire. Franco played the role of popular high school student Mark. The film received positive reviews from critics and went on to make over $41 million worldwide.

In April 2012, Shalom Life ranked him and his brother James at number 2 on its list of "the 50 most talented, intelligent, funny, and gorgeous Jewish men in the world". In March 2012, Franco starred in the Columbia Pictures action comedy film 21 Jump Street as Eric, a high school student and the lead drug dealer. The film was based on the 1987 television series of the same name.

In 2013, he co-starred in the zombie romance film Warm Bodies, as Perry Kelvin. The film, an adaptation of the best-selling novel Warm Bodies, followed a romance between a zombie and a human during a zombie apocalypse. The same year, Franco appeared in the ensemble crime thriller film Now You See Me. To promote the film, he was interviewed on the Bob Rivers Show, based in Seattle. Rivers persuaded Franco to show the card-throwing abilities he had learned and Franco expertly sliced half a banana into a further half with his hotel card.

Franco's 2014 roles included the Seth Rogen comedy Neighbors and a cameo appearance in 22 Jump Street. In 2015, he co-starred with Vince Vaughn and Tom Wilkinson in the comedy Unfinished Business.

In 2016, he reprised his roles in the sequels Neighbors 2: Sorority Rising, as Pete, and Now You See Me 2, as Jack Wilder. The following year, Franco appeared in the well-received comedy The Little Hours, and the acclaimed biographical comedy-drama, The Disaster Artist, which was directed by his brother, James. In the latter film, he portrays Greg Sestero, a young actor who befriends the eccentric Tommy Wiseau, and ultimately stars in Wiseau's film, The Room.
 
In 2018, Franco starred in the addiction drama 6 Balloons opposite Abbi Jacobson, for Netflix. Franco then had a small role in If Beale Street Could Talk, directed by Barry Jenkins. In 2019, Franco starred in Zeroville, directed by his brother, James, which was originally shot in 2014, portraying the role of actor Montgomery Clift. He next starred in the action-thriller 6 Underground, directed by Michael Bay.

2020s
In 2020, Franco made his directorial debut on the horror-thriller The Rental, from a screenplay he wrote alongside Joe Swanberg, which stars Alison Brie, Dan Stevens, Jeremy Allen White, and Sheila Vand. It was released on July 24, 2020.

In 2022, Franco was in the main cast of the Apple TV+ mystery comedy series The Afterparty.

Personal life
Franco started dating actress Alison Brie in 2012. In August 2015, the couple became engaged. On March 13, 2017, representatives for the couple confirmed that they had married in a private ceremony.

Filmography

Film

Television

Video games

Web

Awards and nominations

References

External links

 

1985 births
21st-century American male actors
American male film actors
American male television actors
American people of Portuguese descent
American people of Russian-Jewish descent
American people of Swedish descent
Jewish American male actors
Living people
Male actors from Palo Alto, California
People of Madeiran descent
University of Southern California alumni
American male screenwriters
Jewish American writers
Film directors from California
Screenwriters from California
21st-century American Jews